Boukhelifa is a town and commune in the Béjaïa in northern Algeria.

References

Communes of Béjaïa Province